Hinboun District (Lao : ຫີນບູນ) is a district (muang) of Khammouane Province in mid-Laos.

References

Districts of Khammouane province